Reanard O’Keith "K. J." Hill Jr. (born September 15, 1997) is an American football wide receiver who is a free agent. He played high school football at North Little Rock High School in North Little Rock, Arkansas. He played college football at Ohio State. He is the all-time leading receiver for the Buckeyes with 201 career receptions.

High school career
Playing at North Little Rock High School, Hill committed to Ohio State on February 4, 2015, choosing the Buckeyes over Alabama and Arkansas, among others. Hill had verbally committed to Arkansas in August 2014, but changed his commitment following the departure of Arkansas’ offensive coordinator Jim Chaney.

Coming out of high school, Hill was a consensus 4-star receiver who was named a U.S. Army All-American. Hill was the No. 1 player in the state of Arkansas, and received a No. 16 rating by ESPN and 247Sports and a No. 18 rating by Rivals for receivers. Additionally, Hill was a highly regarded basketball player.

College career
In his first year at Ohio State, Hill redshirted, making him eligible for a fifth-year of eligibility.  After red-shirting the 2015 season, Hill had 18 catches for more than 250 yards and one touchdown in 2016. Hill led Ohio State receivers (10 or more catches) with a 14.6 yards-per-reception average. He played in 11 of 13 games in 2016, missing two with an ankle injury.

During his sophomore season in 2017, he led the team in receptions with 56 and was second in yards with 549. During the game against Penn State, Hill had a career-best 12 receptions, which was the fourth-highest total in school history. Throughout the season, Hill also served as the team's primary punt returner with 26 returns for 144 yards (5.5 average).

The 2018 season was award-winning for Hill, where he was named as an all-Big Ten Honorable Mention for his 70-catch, 885-yard, six-touchdown season. In a win over Minnesota, Hill set a career high with 187 receiving yards, the eighth-highest total in school history, and two touchdowns, off nine receptions. Hill had played in 39 games and caught passes in 34 consecutive games.

Following his junior year, there was speculation that Hill would declare for the NFL Draft. On January 8, 2019, Hill announced on Twitter that he would return saying, “With the guidance and mentorship of Cris Carter and my family, I have decided to take one last ride with my brothers, my coaches, and you, Buckeye Nation!”

College Statistics

Professional career

Hill was drafted by the Los Angeles Chargers in the seventh round with the 220th overall pick of the 2020 NFL Draft.

In Week 3 of the 2020 season, against the Carolina Panthers, Hill made his first professional reception in the 21–16 loss.

On October 21, 2021, Hill was waived by the Chargers and re-signed to the practice squad. His practice squad contract expired upon the end of the 2021 regular season.

References

External links
Los Angeles Chargers bio
Ohio State Buckeyes bio

1997 births
Living people
Players of American football from Arkansas
Sportspeople from Little Rock, Arkansas
American football wide receivers
Ohio State Buckeyes football players
Los Angeles Chargers players